Sergo Karapetyan (6 August 1948 – 18 February 2021) was an Armenian politician.

Biography
He served as Agriculture Minister between 2010 and 2016. On February 18, 2021, Karapetyan died of complications from COVID-19 at the Nairi Medical Center in Yerevan during the COVID-19 pandemic in Armenia.

References

1948 births
2021 deaths
People from Artashat, Armenia
Agriculture ministers of Armenia
Deaths from the COVID-19 pandemic in Armenia